is a Japanese footballer currently playing as a defender for Okinawa SV.

Career
Odajima begin first youth career with Buddy SC, later he enter to Tokyo Verdy as junior and youth team until 2014 and enter college in Too University at Yokohama, Kanagawa from 2015 until he was graduation in 2018.

On 28 December 2018, Odajima begin first career with SC Sagamihara from 2019.

On 25 August 2020, Odajima signed JFL club, Iwaki FC for during 2020 season, he brought his club promotion to J3 and J2 in 2022 and 2023 respectively at two years. He left from the club after three years at Iwaki on 19 November 2022.

On 26 December 2022, Odajima joined newly JFL-promoted club Okinawa SV for the upcoming 2023 season.

Career statistics

Club
.

Notes

Honours
 Iwaki FC
 Japan Football League: 2021

References

External links

1996 births
Living people
People from Tama, Tokyo
Association football people from Tokyo Metropolis
Japanese footballers
Association football defenders
J3 League players
Japan Football League players
SC Sagamihara players
Iwaki FC players
Okinawa SV players